Boissay is a commune in the Seine-Maritime department in the Normandy region in north-western France.

Geography

Population

Places of interest
 The church of St.Martin, dating from the seventeenth century.
 An eighteenth-century dovecote.

See also
Communes of the Seine-Maritime department

References

Communes of Seine-Maritime